is a masculine Japanese given name.

Possible writings
Masaru can be written using different kanji characters and can mean:
勝, "excel"
優, "excel"
大, "large"
将 or 將, "commander"
The name can also be written in hiragana or katakana.

People with the name
Masaru Akiba (勝), a Japanese football player
Masaru Emoto (勝), a Japanese author
Masaru Furukawa (勝), a Japanese swimmer and olympic champion
, Japanese equestrian
Gagamaru Masaru (勝), a Georgian sumo wrestler
Masaru Hamaguchi (優), Japanese comedian
Masaru Hayami (優), the 28th Governor of the Bank of Japan
Masaru Ibuka (大), a Japanese electronics industrialist
Masaru Ikeda (勝), a Japanese actor and voice actor
Grant Masaru Imahara, an American electronics and radio control expert
Masaru Inada (勝), a Japanese skeleton racer
Inoue Masaru (勝), a Japanese samurai known as the "father of the Japanese railways"
, Japanese field hockey player
Masaru Katori (まさる), a female Japanese writer and manga author
Masaru Kageura (將), a Japanese baseball player
, Japanese footballer
Masaru Kitao (勝), a Japanese animator
Masaru Konuma (勝), a Japanese director
Masaru Kurotsu (勝), a Japanese football player
Kyokutenhō Masaru (勝), a Mongolian sumo wrestler
Masaru Matsuhashi (優), a Japanese football player
, Japanese sport wrestler
Masaru Edward Fulenwider-Musashi, a Wushu martial artist, stuntman, and an actor
, Japanese ski jumper
, Japanese baseball player
Masaru Ogawa (勝), a Japanese figure skater
, Japanese baseball player
Masaru Sakurai (賢), a member of the Japanese musical group The Alfee
Masaru Sato (勝), a Japanese composer
Masaru Shimabukuro (優), a member of the Okinawan music band Begin
Masaru Shintani, a Japanese-Canadian Karate master
Masaru Takumi (勝), a Japanese yakuza
Masaru Tobita (将), known as Survival Tobita, a Japanese professional wrestler
Wakanohana Masaru (勝), a Japanese sumo wrestler
, Japanese lawyer and politician

Fictional characters
Masaru (マサル), a character in the manga and animated film Akira
Masaru Daimon (Marcus Damon in the English dub), a character from the anime series Digimon Savers
Masaru Kato (勝), a character from the anime and manga series Gantz
Masaru Aoki of Hajime no Ippo
Masaru Sera, the Third Chairman of the Tojo Clan in the first game in the Yakuza series
Masaru Watase, the Waka gashira of the Omi Alliance in Yakuza 5
Masaru "Echo" Enatsu, an SAT operative in Tom Clancy's Rainbow Six Siege.
Masaru Daimon, a character in Danganronpa Another Episode: Ultra Despair Girls.
Masaru Bakugou (爆豪 勝), Katsuki Bakugo's father and the husband of Mitsuki Bakugo in the manga and anime My Hero Academia
Konaka Masaru (Japanese name for Redd White), a character in Ace Attorney

See also
27791 Masaru, a main-belt asteroid
IEEE Masaru Ibuka Consumer Electronics Award
Sexy Commando Gaiden: Sugoiyo!! Masaru-san, a manga series

Japanese masculine given names